Sleeping with Other People is a 2015 American romantic comedy film directed and written by Leslye Headland. The film stars Jason Sudeikis, Alison Brie, Natasha Lyonne, Amanda Peet, and Adam Scott. Premiering at the 2015 Sundance Film Festival on January 24, 2015, the film was released theatrically on September 11, 2015, by IFC Films. Sleeping with Other People received generally positive reviews from critics.

Plot
In 2002, Lainey causes a scene in a dorm at Columbia University. Taking pity on her as she is about to be kicked out by security, Jake claims her as his guest. He learns that Lainey was there in order to lose her virginity to her T.A., Matthew, who Jake thinks is the most boring guy in the world. Lainey eventually realizes that Jake is also a virgin, and the two lose their virginity to each other.

Years later, Lainey breaks up with her long-term boyfriend Sam after telling him she has been cheating on him. On the advice of her therapist she attends a sex addicts meeting, where she runs into Jake, who is there because of his inability to commit. Lainey schedules an appointment with Matthew to end their affair; he agrees and tells her that he is engaged, but they end up having sex. 

On the advice of a friend Lainey contacts Jake, and they go on one date where they confess their sexual problems to one another. At the end of the date Jake confesses that he wants to sleep with her; however, Lainey insists that they should just be friends and Jake agrees with the safe word "mousetrap" to be used to deflate sexual tension between them.

They hang out more and eventually become best friends, confiding in each other about their dating lives as they try to move past their commitment issues. Strangers mistake them for a couple and their friends begin to think they are in a relationship as well. Jake learns that Lainey is going to re-enroll in medical school and possibly move to Michigan. He brings her to the birthday party of his friend's child where she meets Chris and begins seeing him to Jake's chagrin. Jake decides to move on and asks his boss Paula on a date.

A date with Chris leads Lainey to run into Matthew and his now-pregnant wife. At the same time, Jake has sex with Paula and calls her Lainey. After their nights out, Jake and Lainey spend the night together where they realize that they are in love with each another; however, they do nothing about it, afraid to mess up their relationship.

Lainey moves to Michigan and Jake devotes himself to Paula. Two months after she has left, during brunch with Paula, Jake sees Matthew and punches him in the face. Paula breaks up with Jake after he refers to Lainey as "my girl" and Jake is arrested. He calls Lainey from the police station and confesses he is still in love with her, and wants to pursue a relationship even if it fails. She tells him she feels the same way.

Some time later, Matthew is suing Jake for emotional distress and refuses every settlement he offers. Lainey goes to see him and tells him she will tell his wife about their relationship if he does not drop the case. After leaving his office, Lainey meets with Jake and the two rush off to be married.

Cast

 Jason Sudeikis as Jake Harper
 Alison Brie as Elaine "Lainey" Dalton
 Adam Scott as Dr. Matthew Sobvechik
 Katherine Waterston as Emma
 Jason Mantzoukas as Xander
 Andrea Savage as Naomi
 Natasha Lyonne as Kara
 Adam Brody as Sam
 Amanda Peet as Paula
 Marc Blucas as Chris Smith
 Margarita Levieva as Hannah
 Billy Eichner as SLAA Speaker
 Michael Cyril Creighton as Attentive Waiter
 Daniella Pineda as Danica

Production
After the debut of her last film, Bachelorette, Headland became what she would later define as "suicidally depressed" noting that at one point "I was literally wondering, Should I check myself into a psych ward?" To help cope with this she went to Big Sur where she "wrote all day and all night". She realized she wanted to write a movie about sex addiction after entering into a relationship with someone who was already seeing another person, recalling that at one point she drove to his house "I just started crying hysterically. I pulled over and just kept crying. It was sort of like, What is my problem right now? Is it that I'm in love with him? Is it that I feel guilty? Is it that I'm doing something I don't want to do?" From the start she did not set out to make a romantic comedy although when she realized she was making one she wanted to make sure "that it all felt very believable".

For research purposes she attended sexual addiction meetings as well as read many books about the subject, including Your Brain on Sex and the relationship addiction book Leaving the Enchanted Forrest.

Filming
The principal photography of the film took place in New York City in the summer of 2014.

Music
In October 2014, Andrew Feltenstein and John Nau were hired to compose the music for the film.

Release
The film had its world premiere at the Sundance Film Festival on January 24, 2015. On February 6, 2015, IFC Films had acquired distribution rights to the film. The film premiered at the Sarasota Film Festival on April 17, 2015. The film went on to premiere at the Tribeca Film Festival on April 21, 2015. and then the Montclair Film Festival on May 8, 2015. The Seattle International Film Festival on June 5, 2015 and the Provincetown Film Festival on June 27, 2015. The film had its European premiere at the Edinburgh International Film Festival on June 18, 2015.

The film was released in the United States on September 11, 2015, in a limited release by IFC Films.

Critical reception
On Rotten Tomatoes, the film has an approval rating of 63% based on 133 reviews, with an average score of 6.1/10. The site's critical consensus reads: "Sleeping with Other People has likable leads and flashes of inspiration, but seems unwilling or unable to surround them with the truly subversive rom-com they deserve." On Metacritic, the film has a weighted average score of 64 out of 100, based on 27 critics, indicating "generally favorable reviews".

Indiewire gave the film a positive review, describing it as "a refreshingly funny and romantic feature that is more than worth falling in love with (again and again)".

References

External links
 
 
 
 

2015 independent films
2015 romantic comedy films
2010s sex comedy films
2015 films
American independent films
American romantic comedy films
American sex comedy films
Films about sex addiction
Films directed by Leslye Headland
Films produced by Sidney Kimmel
Films set in New York City
Films shot in New York City
Gloria Sanchez Productions films
IM Global films
Sidney Kimmel Entertainment films
2010s English-language films
2010s American films